Babu Annur also known as C. K. Babu is an Indian film and theater actor, working predominantly in the Malayalam movie industry. He is actively involved in theater in Malayalam as an actor since 1974. He has done more than seventy-five plays as of 2020. Babu was born on 14 May 1962 in the municipality of Payyannur, Kannur, to Kunjirama Pothuval and Kodi Amma. He started acting in theater at the age of twelve as a child artist at Ravi Varma Kala Nilayam with his elder brothers CK Ramakrishnan & CK Thamapan who were involved in theatre.,

Awards
  Best Actor award constituted by Kerala Sangeetha Nataka Akademi in 1998 for the play Kelu 
  Best Second Actor award constituted by Kerala Sangeetha Nataka Akademi in 2002 for the play Agniyum Varshavum
  Kerala State television awards in 2005 Special jury award for Janmam  credited as CK Babu
  Kerala State Television Award for Best Actor in 2011 for Divathinu swantham Devootty.

Filmography

References

External links
 
 അഭിനയരംഗത്ത് നാല് പതിറ്റാണ്ട് പിന്നിടുന്ന ബാബു അന്നൂര്‍ മോര്‍ണിംഗ് ഷോയില്‍ 
 Manju Warrier withdraws Chathur Mukham from theatres, promises to re-release when it’s safe 
 

Indian male film actors
Male actors from Kannur
Male actors in Malayalam cinema
21st-century Indian male actors
Living people
1962 births